Journal Star may refer to:

Lincoln Journal Star, a daily newspaper of Lincoln, Nebraska
Peoria Journal Star, a daily newspaper of Peoria, Illinois

See also
The Daily Star-Journal, of Warrensburg, Missouri